Rogério dos Santos Conceição (born 20 September 1984), known as Rogério Conceição or just Rogério, is a Brazilian retired footballer who played as a central defender.

References

External links
 

1984 births
Brazilian footballers
Brazilian expatriate footballers
Association football defenders
Living people
Santos FC players
Guarani FC players
Marília Atlético Clube players
Sociedade Esportiva do Gama players
Criciúma Esporte Clube players
Associação Desportiva São Caetano players
Gyeongnam FC players
Associação Naval 1º de Maio players
Santa Cruz Futebol Clube players
C.D. Feirense players
Al-Ittihad Club (Tripoli) players
Agremiação Sportiva Arapiraquense players
Expatriate footballers in South Korea
K League 1 players
Brazilian expatriate sportspeople in South Korea
Expatriate footballers in Portugal
Primeira Liga players
Brazilian expatriate sportspeople in Portugal
Expatriate footballers in Libya
Libyan Premier League players